The 2013 Jeff Foxworthy's Grit Chips 300 was the fourth stock car race of the 2013 NASCAR Nationwide Series and the 31st iteration of the event. The race was held on Saturday, March 16, in Bristol, Tennessee, at Bristol Motor Speedway, a 0.533 miles (0.858 km) permanent oval-shaped racetrack. The race took the scheduled 300 laps to complete. In a wild finish, Joe Gibbs Racing driver Kyle Busch would defend eventual second-place Turner Scott Motorsports driver Kyle Larson in one of closest NASCAR Nationwide Series finishes to date, by 0.023 seconds. The win was Busch's 53rd career NASCAR Nationwide Series win and his second of the season. To fill out the podium, Brian Vickers of Joe Gibbs Racing finished third.

Background 

The Bristol Motor Speedway, formerly known as Bristol International Raceway and Bristol Raceway, is a NASCAR short track venue located in Bristol, Tennessee. Constructed in 1960, it held its first NASCAR race on July 30, 1961. Despite its short length, Bristol is among the most popular tracks on the NASCAR schedule because of its distinct features, which include extraordinarily steep banking, an all concrete surface, two pit roads, and stadium-like seating. It has also been named one of the loudest NASCAR tracks.

Entry list

Practice

First practice 
The first practice session was held on Friday, March 15, at 10:30 AM EST, and would last for an hour and 20 minutes.

Second and final practice 
The second and final practice session, sometimes referred to as Happy Hour, was held on Friday, March 15, at 2:00 PM EST, and would last for an hour and 30 minutes.

Qualifying 
Qualifying was held on Saturday, March 16, at 10:35 AM EST. Each driver would have two laps to set a fastest time; the fastest of the two would count as their official qualifying lap.

Three drivers would fail to qualify: Morgan Shepherd, Danny Efland, and Joey Gase, who withdrew after crashing in practice.

Full qualifying results

Race results

References 

2013 NASCAR Nationwide Series
NASCAR races at Bristol Motor Speedway
March 2013 sports events in the United States
2013 in sports in Tennessee